Poli Hajji (also Romanized as Polī Ḩājjī; also known as Qolī Ḩājjī) is a village in Fajr Rural District, in the Central District of Gonbad-e Qabus County, Golestan Province, Iran. At the 2006 census, its population was 2,083, in 441 families.

References 

Populated places in Gonbad-e Kavus County